Dapeng Jinchi Mingwang, also known as the Golden-Winged Great Peng, is a guardian deity in Mahayana Buddhism. He is the spiritual uncle of the Buddha, who gave him a high position in heaven to guard the Pure land. His origins are said to derive from an Indian bird god Garuda. Peng is one of the eight demi-gods of Buddhism (Tianlong Babu). He helps to guard Mount Sumeru and Trāyastriṃśa from attack by the Asuras.

Peng appears in works of ancient Chinese literature, including Journey to the West (西游記) and General Yue Fei (說岳全傳). He is also mentioned in some Chinese Buddhist literature.  The famous patriot General Yue Fei (岳飛, 1103–1141), was believed by people as the incarnate of the Dapeng Jinchi Mingwang.

Legends

Legend holds that in primordial times the original Phoenix (Fenghuang), the leader of flying beings, gave birth to the peacock Mahamayuri and to the eagle named the Golden Winged Great Peng. The peacock once consumed the Buddha who managed to escape by cutting through her stomach. The Buddha intended to kill the peacock but the deities told him to stop. The Buddha then promoted the peacock to be his godmother, which made the eagle his uncle, and gave the eagle a high position in heaven.

Peng sits at the head of the Buddha's throne in the Western Paradise. His fiery temper was aroused when the bat-spirit Nü Tofu listened to the Buddha's sermon on the Lotus Sutra at Leiyin Temple with other stars. Nü Tofu was fascinated and accidentally broke wind which stained the Buddhists' pure land. As a result, Peng swooped down from the throne and snatched Nü Tofu up in his beak, killing her. The Buddha admonished Peng for transgressing Buddhist law and exiled him to earth. Later, Peng reincarnates as Yue Fei and the bat-spirit reincarnates as Lady Wang (王氏) marrying Qin Hui, during the Song Dynasty. Under Qin Hui's poisonous plot, Lady Wang killed Yue Fei in revenge.

According to  martial arts master Liang Shouyu's book, "[A] Dapeng is a great bird that lived in ancient China. Legend has it, that Dapeng was the guardian that stayed above the head of Gautama Buddha. Dapeng could get rid of all evil in any area. Even the Monkey King was no match for it. During the Song dynasty, the government was corrupt and foreigners were constantly invading China. The Buddha sent Dapeng to earth to protect China. Dapeng descended to Earth and was born as Yue Fei."

Journey to the West

Peng is an antagonist in the 16th-century Chinese classic novel Journey to the West. He is a demonic eagle born from the primordial Phoenix. The Buddha gave the Eagle a high position in Heaven which only served to fuel his ego. For an unknown reason, the Eagle transformed himself into a humanoid form, the Golden Winged Great Peng, ate all residents of the Lion Camel Kingdom, ruled it for 500 years, and befriended the Azure Lion Demon and the Yellow-Toothed Elephant Demon to eat Tang Sanzang. Great Peng's powers and position of being the Buddha's uncle fuel his ego as he regarded himself above everyone else. He is armed with a ji and can fly over great distances. Peng has a Flask of Yin and Yang Essence (陰陽二氣瓶) which can suck in unsuspecting victims.

Peng made several plans to capture Tang Sanzang and his companions, and successfully captured Sun Wukong himself. After many humiliating failures under the hand of the three demon kings, Wukong approached the Buddha for help and learned the backstory about Peng. After Wukong and the three demons battle, both the Lion and the Elephant are forced to revert to their original forms, and the Buddha shows up to subdue Peng and return him to Vulture Peak.

After his defeat at the Buddha's hand, Peng admits that he enjoys his demonic life eating humans, but after listening to the Buddha, Peng has no choice but to abandon his evil ways, redeeming himself in the process. After some struggle, the eagle Peng agrees to become a protector of Buddhist law. Much later, Sanzang and his companion received scriptures, and the Buddha, knowing them to be the scriptures without text, ordered the eagle to chase them and destroy the fake scriptures, which the eagle does promptly. As such, Chinese fiction portrays Peng as a powerful demon king that submits to the Buddha and perches above his throne as a hot-tempered guardian deity.

Shurangama Mantra 
The Shurangama Mantra is a dhāraṇī or long mantra of Buddhist practise in China, Japan and Korea. The 302nd line of the mantra pertains to the Great Golden Winged Peng bird, the Garuda, and its retinue which includes all species of birds. The Great Golden Winged Peng is the king among birds. The Peng bird feasts exclusively on dragons. His wing-span measures an astounding 330 yojanas (3,960 to 4,950 km). When Peng flaps his wings, the sea waters part clear to the deepest seabed.

Overview
A literary motif appearing in Journey to the West and The Story of Yue Fei depicts the bird deity Peng as a demon-turned-Buddhist guardian who sits above the Buddha's throne.

The Ming dynasty examples suggest that Peng was considered a common element of the Buddha's enlightenment Torana (arched gateway). In effect, the bird god is a guardian of the faith who watches over the world from an exalted position high atop the Buddha's throne.

See also
 Birds in Chinese mythology
 Fenghuang
 Peng (mythology)

References 

Chinese deities
Chinese gods
Birds in religion